Mountain people may refer to:

 Hill people, or mountain people, is a general term for people who live in hills and mountains
 Ik people, as described in The Mountain People by Colin Turnbull